Philippe Le Billon is a researcher known for his work in political ecology and on the political economy of war. A Fulbright Research Chair at UC Berkeley and Scholar at the Institute for Advanced Study in Princeton, Le Billon is a professor at the University of British Columbia (UBC) with the Department of Geography and the School of Public Policy and Global Affairs. He earned an MBA at the Pantheon-Sorbonne University in Paris and a doctorate at the University of Oxford. Prior to joining UBC he collaborated with the International Institute for Strategic Studies (IISS) and the Overseas Development Institute (ODI).

Contributions 
Working on the environment-development-security nexus, he is the (co)author of about one hundred refereed articles and several books, including on conflict diamonds, corruption in armed conflicts, environmental defenders, extractive industries, fish crimes, fossil fuel phase-out initiatives (e.g. fossil fuel cuts database with Nicolas Gaulin), and the political economy of natural disasters and armed conflicts.

Le Billon served on the editorial board of Political Geography and Environment and Security, the scientific advisory board of Swisspeace, and the founding board of Environmental Peacebuilding Association. His academic research in published in journals such as African Affairs, Annals of the AAG, Antipode, Climate Policy, Geopolitics, Global Environmental Change, Political Geography, Review of International Political Economy, and Science Advances. Some of his research also appeared in AP, CBC, CCTV, Christian Science Monitor, The Globe and Mail, Die Zeit, The Guardian, Financial Times, and The Washington Post. He regularly writes for Policy Options and The Conversation, and collaborates with international and non-governmental organizations.

Notable works 
 Le Billon, Philippe (2000). Political Economy of War: What Relief Agencies Need to Know. Overseas Development Institute.
 Le Billon, Philippe (2001). The Political Ecology of War. Political Geography 20(5): 561–584.
 
 
 
 
 Le Billon, Philippe; Menton Mary (2021). Environmental Defenders. Deadly Struggles for Life and Territory. London: Routledge. ISBN 9780367649647

References

External links 
 

Year of birth missing (living people)
Living people
French geographers
Academic staff of the University of British Columbia
Alumni of the University of Oxford
Political ecologists